Drepanogynis hypopyrrha is a species of moth of the  family Geometridae. It is found in East Madagascar.

The wingspan of this species is 40mm, it is of Prussian red colour, much suffused with some dull purple. The underside is orange-red.

References

Ennominae
Moths described in 1932
Moths of Madagascar
Moths of Africa